John Jones (29 January 1916 – 11 March 1999) was a Scottish professional footballer who played as an inside left.

Career
Born in Gourock, Jones played for Morton Juniors, Third Lanark, Bradford City, Morton, Cowdenbeath, Stirling Albion, St Mirren and Kilmarnock. He trialled for Bradford City from Third Lanark between September and October 1946, scoring once in two Football League appearances.

Sources

References

1916 births
1999 deaths
Scottish footballers
Third Lanark A.C. players
Bradford City A.F.C. players
Greenock Morton F.C. players
Cowdenbeath F.C. players
Stirling Albion F.C. players
St Mirren F.C. players
Kilmarnock F.C. players
Scottish Football League players
English Football League players
Association football inside forwards